The Scottish Maritime Museum is an industrial museum with a Collection Recognised as Nationally Significant to Scotland. It is located at two sites in the West of Scotland in Irvine and Dumbarton, with a focus on Scotland's shipbuilding heritage.

Irvine - The Linthouse 
The museum's Linthouse building is located at Irvine Harbour, situated within the category A listed former Engine Shop of Alexander Stephen and Sons, which was salvaged and relocated from their derelict Linthouse shipyard in Glasgow in 1991. The Linthouse engineering shop is now home to a collection of significant vessels including MV Kyles and MV Spartan which are listed on the National Historic Ships UK register. A highly significant vessel built of iron in 1872 in Paisley, MV Kyles is the oldest iron Clyde built vessel still afloat in the UK. It entered the museum's collection in 1984. The museum also has a collection of marine engines and industrial machine tools, and owns a recreated 1920s worker's tenement flat at Irvine Harbour. The museum also has a significant collection of artwork funded by the Heritage Lottery Fund. In 2020 the museum managed to raise funds to keep MV Kyles as a floating vessel.

Dumbarton - Denny Ship Model Experiment Tank
The Denny Ship Model Experiment Tank, in Dumbarton, focuses on the world of the naval architect. Shipbuilder William Denny Jr of William Denny and Brothers was inspired by the work of eminent naval architect William Froude and completed the tank for his shipyard in 1883. It was the world's first commercial example of a ship testing tank. Re-opened as a museum in 1983, it retains many of its original features, including the original 100-meter-long tank. The museum also tells the story of the test tank's original owners, William Denny and Brothers of Dumbarton, one of the most innovative shipbuilding companies in the world until their closure in 1963.

Trust structure
The museum is an independent museum operated by a charitable trust: the Scottish Maritime Museum Trust. It became operational in 1983. The first trust chairperson was Clydeside shipbuilder Ross Belch who held the post until 1998 The trust includes Scottish industrial historian John R. Hume among its trustees. The founding Director was Dr Henry C. McMurray.

See also
Titan Clydebank
Summerlee, Museum of Scottish Industrial Life
Riverside Museum
Aberdeen Maritime Museum
City of Adelaide (1864)
Boyd's Automatic tide signalling apparatus
William Denny and Brothers
Irvine Harbour

Notes

Further reading

 Douglas McGowan, Clydebuilt: A Photographic Legacy, 2005, Tempus Publishing, 
 John Shields, Clyde Built: A History of Shipbuilding on the River Clyde, 1949, William MacLellan

External links

Scottish Maritime Museum at Irvine and Dumbarton
Scottish Maritime Museum on AboutBritain.com

Ships of Scotland
Transport museums in Scotland
Museums in North Ayrshire
Museums in West Dunbartonshire
Museums in Renfrewshire
Maritime museums in Scotland
Irvine, North Ayrshire